The 2023 Players Championship (officially the 2023 Duelbits Players Championship) was a professional snooker tournament that took place from 20 to 26 February 2023 at the Aldersley Leisure Village in Wolverhampton, England. The 12th ranking event of the 2022–23 season, it was the second event in the Players Series, following the World Grand Prix and preceding the Tour Championship. Featuring the top 16 players on the one-year ranking list as it stood after the 2023 Welsh Open, the event was broadcast by ITV Sport in the United Kingdom, by Eurosport in Europe, and by multiple other broadcasters internationally. The winner received £125,000 from a total prize fund of £385,000.

Neil Robertson won the 2022 event, defeating Barry Hawkins 10–5 in the final, but was unable to defend the title as he was ranked outside the top 16 on the one-year ranking list at the cutoff point. Shaun Murphy won the tournament, defeating Ali Carter 10–4 in the final to claim the 10th ranking title of his career and his first ranking event win since the 2020 Welsh Open. Murphy also made the tournament's five largest , the highest of which was a 145 in the second frame of the final. Of the 23 century breaks made at the event, Murphy compiled 11, breaking the previous tournament record of eight centuries set by John Higgins at the 2021 event.

Format

Prize fund 
The event featured a prize pool of £385,000 with the winner receiving £125,000. The breakdown of prize money for the event is shown below:
 Winner: £125,000
 Runner-up: £50,000
 Semi-final: £30,000
 Quarter-final: £15,000
 Last 16: £10,000
 Highest break: £10,000
 Total: £385,000

Seeding list 
The seedings for the tournament were based on the one-year ranking list up to and including the 2023 Welsh Open.

Tournament draw 
Results from the event are shown below. Players in bold denote match winners.

Final

Century breaks 
There were 23 century breaks made during the event. Murphy made the highest of the tournament, a 145 during the final. Of the 23, 11 were made by Murphy, including the highest five.

 145, 141, 137, 135, 133, 130, 112, 107, 105, 104, 103  Shaun Murphy
 132, 125  Joe O'Connor
 126  Ding Junhui
 122, 107  Ali Carter
 121, 104, 100  Kyren Wilson
 115  Gary Wilson
 104  Jack Lisowski
 102  Ryan Day
 100  Zhou Yuelong

References 

Players Championship
Snooker competitions in England
Players Series
Sport in Wolverhampton
February 2023 sports events in the United Kingdom
Players Championship